Seán or Sean Burke may refer to:

 Seán Burke (Gaelic footballer) (born 1970), Irish retired Gaelic footballer
 Seán Burke (hurler), Irish hurler
 Sean Burke (born 1967), Canadian former professional ice hockey goaltender
 Sean Burke (baseball), baseball player
 Seán Burke (author), literary theorist and novelist
 Sean M. Burke, author, linguist and programmer
 Sean Burke, English musician and former member of Tubeway Army
 Shawn Burke, of Hamilton Tiger-Cats